The Second Division Football Tournament for the 2008 season in the Maldives won by the Red Line Club by defeating the defending champions Club All Youth Linkage.

Group stage

Group A

Group B

Group C

Second round

Group A

Group B

Final

Awards

External links
AYL and Teenage to start the league at Haveeru Online (Dhivehi)
AYL to second round at Haveeru Online (Dhivehi)
FAM took action without proof -KIN at Haveeru Online (Dhivehi)
Second Division 2008 at rsssf.com

References

Maldivian Second Division Football Tournament seasons
Maldives
Maldives
2